Phthia (minor planet designation: 189 Phthia) is a bright-coloured, rocky main belt asteroid that was discovered by German-American astronomer Christian Heinrich Friedrich Peters on September 9, 1878 in Clinton, New York and named after Phthia, a region of Ancient Greece.

Photometric observations of this asteroid at the Organ Mesa Observatory in Las Cruces, New Mexico during 2008 gave a light curve with a period of 22.346 ± 0.001 hours and a brightness variation of 0.26 ± 0.02 in magnitude.

References

External links
 
 

Background asteroids
Phthia
Phthia
S-type asteroids (Tholen)
Sa-type asteroids (SMASS)
18780909